Eingya is the second album by Keith Kenniff as Helios. It was released in 2006 on Type Records. It is in an ambient style.

Track listing

2006 albums
Keith Kenniff albums